The name Tara has been used for four tropical cyclones in the Eastern Pacific Ocean.
 Hurricane Tara (1961) – a catastrophic Category 1 hurricane. 
 Tropical Storm Tara (1968) – never threatened land. 
 Tropical Storm Tara (1982) – never threatened land. 
 Tropical Storm Tara (2018) – brushed southwestern Mexico.

Pacific hurricane set index articles